Riverside USD 114 is a public unified school district headquartered in Elwood, Kansas, United States.  The district includes the communities of Elwood, Wathena, Blair, and nearby rural areas.

Schools
The school district operates the following schools:
 Elwood High School
 Wathena High School
 Elwood Elementary School
 Wathena Elementary School

History
It was formed in 2010 by the merger of Wathena USD 406 and Elwood USD 486.

See also
 Kansas State Department of Education
 Kansas State High School Activities Association
 List of high schools in Kansas
 List of unified school districts in Kansas

References

External links
 

School districts in Kansas
School districts established in 2010
2010 establishments in Kansas
Education in Doniphan County, Kansas